Mykola Syniuk (born 19 April 1988) is a Ukrainian paracanoeist. He represented Ukraine at the 2016 and 2020 Summer Paralympics.

Career
Syniuk represented Ukraine at the 2016 Summer Paralympics in the men's KL2 event and finished in fourth place with a time of 45.349.

Mazhula represented Ukraine at the 2020 Summer Paralympics in the men's KL2 event and won a silver medal with a time of 42.503.

References

1988 births
Living people
Ukrainian male canoeists
Paracanoeists at the 2016 Summer Paralympics
Paracanoeists at the 2020 Summer Paralympics
Medalists at the 2020 Summer Paralympics
Paralympic medalists in paracanoe
Paralympic silver medalists for Ukraine
ICF Canoe Sprint World Championships medalists in paracanoe
20th-century Ukrainian people
21st-century Ukrainian people